Captain Cutaneum is a character-superhero created by Phoenix-area dermatopathologist Ruskin R Lines, III, M.D. in 2006. The purpose behind the character is to spread awareness among children of skin health and especially the dangers of excessive sun exposure. Dr. Lines's campaign has been mentioned in local newspapers and in the dermatology journals Skin and Allergy News and Dermatology Times.

References

External links
 

Fictional characters from Arizona
Male characters in advertising
Public service announcement characters
Mascots introduced in 2006